Vincent Bernard "The Undertaker" Brown (born January 9, 1965) is an American football coach and former player.  He played professionally in the National Football League (NFL) linebacker  with the New England Patriots from 1988 to 1995. Brown's NFL career ended abruptly at age 30. After eight years of playing linebacker for the Patriots, he was suddenly and unexpectedly told that his career was over. His career was one of the best in Patriots history as an inside linebacker. On January 6, 2023, Brown was hired to become the next Head coach of North Carolina A&T.

Head coaching record

References

External links
 

1965 births
Living people
American football linebackers
Dallas Cowboys coaches
Howard Bison football coaches
Mississippi Valley State Delta Devils football players
New England Patriots players
Richmond Spiders football coaches
UConn Huskies football coaches
Virginia Cavaliers football coaches
William & Mary Tribe football coaches
High school football coaches in Georgia (U.S. state)
Players of American football from Atlanta
African-American coaches of American football
African-American players of American football
Ed Block Courage Award recipients
North Carolina A&T Aggies football coaches